Ukraine's 10th electoral district is a Verkhovna Rada constituency in the Autonomous Republic of Crimea. Established in its current form in 2012, it contains the city of Bakhchysarai, as well as Bakhchysarai Raion and parts of Simferopol Raion. The constituency was home to 159,391 registered voters in 2012, and has 130 voting stations. Since the Annexation of Crimea by the Russian Federation in 2014, the seat has been vacant.

The constituency is bordered by the 4th and 3rd electoral districts to the north, the 1st, 2nd, and 8th districts to the west, the 7th and 224th districts to the south, and the 225th district and Kalamita Bay to the east.

People's Deputies

Elections

2012

See also 
 Electoral districts of Ukraine
 Foreign electoral district of Ukraine

References 

Electoral districts of Ukraine
Constituencies established in 2012